Jean-Étienne (Stephen) Fournier (1852–1929) was a Canadian politician, who served as the first mayor of Sudbury, Ontario.

Born in Trois-Pistoles, Quebec, Fournier worked for the Central Canada Railway and the Canadian Pacific Railway in Petawawa before moving to Sudbury, where he became the community's first postmaster
 in 1884. In 1885, he established the community's first general store, and was elected reeve of McKim Township. When Sudbury was incorporated as a town in 1893, he became the town's first mayor, and served a second term as mayor in 1896.

Fournier was also chair of the town's first school board; classes were initially held in his own home until the town's first school was built. Fournier Gardens on Louis Street in Sudbury was named in his honour.

References

External links
 Stephen Fournier bio at Sudbury Living Magazine

1852 births
1929 deaths
Franco-Ontarian people
French Quebecers
Mayors of Sudbury, Ontario
People from Trois-Pistoles, Quebec
Ontario school board trustees
Canadian postmasters